This is a list of volumes and chapters of the manga series Hellsing written and illustrated by Kouta Hirano. It first premiered in Young King Ours in 1997 and ran for eleven years until the final chapter was released in the November 2008 issue. The individual chapters are collected and published in tankōbon volumes by Shōnen Gahosha, with all 10 volumes released as of March 2009. In 2001, Hirano began publishing chapters of a prequel series, Hellsing: The Dawn, in special editions of Young King OURs, with six chapters released as of September 2008. Hellsing chronicles the efforts of the mysterious and secret Hellsing Organization, as it combats vampires, zombies called "ghouls", and other supernatural foes who threaten the United Kingdom.

The series is licensed for an English language release in North America by Dark Horse Comics. The first volume was released on 1 December 2003 and as of October 2008, the company has published nine translated volumes. Chuang Yi is releasing the series in English in Singapore, with six volumes released as of October 2008, and through an agreement with the company, Madman Entertainment is re-releasing those volumes in Australia and New Zealand. Hellsing is also licensed for regional language releases in France by Editions Tonkam, in Italy by Dynit, in Germany by Planet Manga, in Poland by Japonica Polonica Fantastica and in Denmark and Sweden by Mangismo.


Volume list

Hellsing the Dawn chapters
 Chapter 1
 Chapter 2
 Chapter 3
 Chapter 4
 Chapter 5
 Chapter 6

References

Hellsing
Hellsing